Antony Rivers Marlow (born 17 June 1940), known as Tony Marlow, is a British former Conservative politician who served as Member of Parliament (MP) between 1979 and 1997.

Early life

Born in Greenwich, London, Marlow was educated at Wellington College, RMA Sandhurst and St Catharine's College, Cambridge.

At the age of ten he spent a year in Istanbul crossing the Bosporus daily to go to school.

Marlow was commissioned into the Royal Engineers in 1960, spending four years in the BAOR - including time as troop commander of the, then, only amphibious bridging troop, retiring as a Captain in 1969.

Parliamentary career

After leaving the army he was employed in management consultancy and commercial development. Before he entered the House, Marlow unsuccessfully fought Normanton in February 1974 and Rugby in October 1974. He gained Northampton North at the 1979 election, defeating the Labour MP Maureen Colquhoun.

Subsequently, he had a reliably Eurosceptic voting record, voting against the Single European Act and the Maastricht Treaty, as well as  against the entry of Spain and Portugal into the EEC. He was one of the eight Conservative MPs who had the party whip withdrawn for opposing a confidence vote, called during the debates on Maastricht Treaty. Together with other rebels, he supported an ultimately successful Labour amendment which set the level of VAT on fuel at half the government's proposed level, a rate that remains to this day.

After losing the whip for his rebellion over the Maastricht Treaty, Marlow endorsed John Redwood's unsuccessful challenge to John Major for the leadership of the Conservative Party in 1995.

He was for many years Chairman of the UK Palestine All Party Group, leading and organising delegations to meet Yasser Arafat and to visit Southern Lebanon, the West Bank and the Gaza Strip.

With Professor Alan Woodruff of the London School of Hygiene and Tropical Medicine, Marlow campaigned against dog nuisance based on the dangers arising from Toxocara canis, initiating the Parliamentary campaign through the introduction of a ten-minute rule bill.

Marlow was Chairman of the Crossrail Private Bill Committee [the last such committee]. Although impressed by the concept, at the time demand for urban travel in London was declining with increasingly sophisticated electronic communications leading to a progressive closure of back offices. It also became apparent that sufficient Treasury funding was unlikely to be forthcoming and that had the Bill been agreed, large parts of east London would have been threatened with planning blight. The Committee voted against the Bill.

He was censured by the then-speaker Betty Boothroyd for referring to Harriet Harman as a "stupid cow" during a debate about mad cow disease on 25 March 1996.
 
Marlow lost his seat in the 1997 election to Labour's Sally Keeble.

Since leaving Parliament Marlow has been farming in West Wales with a flock of sheep, 70 pure bred Limousin cattle, arable and woodland - over 100 acres of which he has planted. He has also designed and built/converted twenty five houses. He has a large family.

References

Times Guide to the House of Commons, Times Newspapers Limited, 1997 edition.

External links
Northampton North Conservative Association

1940 births
Alumni of St Catharine's College, Cambridge
Conservative Party (UK) MPs for English constituencies
English expatriates in Turkey
Living people
People educated at Wellington College, Berkshire
Royal Engineers officers
Marlow, Tony
Marlow, Tony
Marlow, Tony
Marlow, Tony
British Eurosceptics